Chasing the Saturdays is an American reality documentary television series that follows the British-Irish girl group The Saturdays. The series premiered on January 20, 2013, at 10 pm ET/PT on E!.

On June 1, 2013, 4Music revealed an advert which announced that the show should premiere on their channel soon. Another advert then revealed the show would premiere on 13 June 2013 at 9pm.

Premise
The series chronicles the lives of the group who, after scoring a string of hits in their native United Kingdom, attempt to strike it big in the United States through their signing with Mercury Records, as they prepare to promote their first American album release. In addition, the series details the personal and private lives of each of the five members.

Production
The series was ordered by E! president Suzanne Kolb, who said "The Saturdays are a pop phenomenon with magnetic appeal and tremendous talent, and we are excited to capture their next chapter as they win over the hearts and playlists of America," adding that "'Chasing the Saturdays' is a perfect addition to E!'s popular Sunday night reality block, which continues to deliver can't miss original programming to viewers year-round."

Cast

Main
 Frankie Bridge
 Una Healy
 Rochelle Humes
 Mollie King
 Vanessa White

Recurring
 Aoife-Belle Foden
 Ben Foden
 Anne Healy
 Marvin Humes
 Peter Loraine
 Victoria Sandford

Episodes

Ratings and viewership
Upon its premiere in the United Kingdom, Chasing the Saturdays became that week's number-one most watched show on E! with 72,000 viewers, having 10,000 more viewers than Kourtney and Khloé Take Miami.

On May 14, 2013, it was reported that the show would not be returning for a second season. However, a representative for the Saturdays stated that the series was only commissioned for one season and although the series won't be returning, a Christmas special is a possibility.

References

External links
The Saturdays' official website

2010s American reality television series
2013 American television series debuts
2013 American television series endings
Celebrity reality television series
English-language television shows
E! original programming
Television series based on singers and musicians
Television shows set in Los Angeles